Sterling Small is a former Republican member of the Montana House of Representatives.  He represented District 41 from 2010 to 2012, until his defeat by Rae Peppers.

References

Living people
Republican Party members of the Montana House of Representatives
People from Big Horn County, Montana
Year of birth missing (living people)